The eleventh season of the American fictional drama television series ER first aired on September 23, 2004, and concluded on May 19, 2005.  The eleventh season consists of 22 episodes.

Plot

Several long term characters exit the series including Corday who quits after performing an illegal operation, Chen leaves to care for her ailing father and Carter also departs the ER to return to Africa with Kem. Elsewhere Lewis is promoted to ER Chief, Abby and Neela begin their internships along with newcomer Ray Barnett, Carter and Lewis compete for tenure, Weaver finally meets her biological mother, Kovač and Sam's relationship deteriorates and Gallant makes an unexpected return from Iraq.

Cast

Main cast
 Noah Wyle as Dr. John Carter – Attending Physician
 Maura Tierney as Dr. Abby Lockhart – Intern PGY-1
 Mekhi Phifer as Dr. Greg Pratt – Resident PGY-3
 Alex Kingston as Dr. Elizabeth Corday – Chief of Surgery (episodes 1–4)
 Goran Visnjic as Dr. Luka Kovač – Attending Physician
 Sherry Stringfield as Dr. Susan Lewis – Chief of Emergency Medicine
 Ming-Na as Dr. Jing-Mei Chen – Attending Physician (episodes 1–9)
 Parminder Nagra as Dr. Neela Rasgotra – Intern PGY-1
 Linda Cardellini as Nurse Samantha Taggart
 Shane West as Dr. Ray Barnett – Intern PGY-1
 Laura Innes as Dr. Kerry Weaver – Chief of Staff

Supporting cast

Doctors and medical students
 Sam Anderson as Dr. Jack Kayson – Chief of Cardiology
 John Aylward as Dr. Donald Anspaugh – Surgeon and Hospital Board Member
 Leland Orser as Dr. Lucien Dubenko – Attending Surgeon, later Chief of Surgery
 Scott Grimes as Dr. Archie Morris – Resident PGY-3
 Sara Gilbert as Jane Figler – Fourth-year Medical Student
 Eion Bailey as Jake Scanlon – Medical Student
 Lou Richards as Dr. Perkins
 Francesco Quinn as Dr. Alfonso Ramírez
 Andy Powers as Dr. Howard Ritzke
 Norbert Weisser as Dr. Adler
 Anthony Giangrande as Dr. Jeremy Munson – Intern PGY-1
 Michael Spellman as Dr. Jim Babinski – Intern PGY-1
 Giovannie Espiritu as Ludlow - Medical Student 

Nurses
 Deezer D as Nurse Malik McGrath
 Laura Cerón as Nurse Chuny Márquez
 Yvette Freeman as Nurse Haleh Adams
 Lily Mariye as Nurse Lily Jarvik
 Dinah Lenney as Nurse Shirley
 Bellina Logan as Nurse Kit
 Kyle Richards as Nurse Dori Kerns
 Liza Del Mundo as Nurse Severa
 Sumalee Montano as Nurse Duvata Mahal
 Nadia Shazana as OR Nurse Jacy
 Tane Kawasaki as Nurse Claire
 Mary Heiss as Nurse Mary

Staff, Paramedics and Officers
 Abraham Benrubi as Desk Clerk Jerry Markovic
 Mädchen Amick as Social Worker Wendall Meade
 Troy Evans as Desk Clerk Frank Martin
 Pamela Sinha as Desk Clerk Amira
 Jordan Calloway as Hospital Volunteer K.J. Thibeaux
 China Shavers as Olivia Evans from Ceasefire
 Emily Wagner as Paramedic Doris Pickman
 Montae Russell as Paramedic Dwight Zadro
 Lyn. A Henderson as Paramedic Pamela Olbes
 Brian Lester as Paramedic Brian Dumar
 Michelle C. Bonilla as Paramedic Christine Harms
 Demetrius Navarro as Paramedic Morales
 Louie Liberti as Paramedic Bardelli
 Meg Thalken as Chopper EMT Dee McManus
 Chad McKnight as Officer Wilson

Family
 Thandie Newton as Makemba "Kem" Likasu
 Henry O as Mr. Chen
 Renee Victor as Florina Lopez
 José Zúñiga as Eduardo Lopez
 Donal Logue as (Flight Nurse) Chuck Martin
 Oliver Davis as Alex Taggart				
 Garret Dillahunt as Steve Curtis
 Anupam Kher as Ajay Rasgotra
 Kiron Kher as Mrs. Rasgotra
 Frances Fisher as Helen Kingsley
 Danny Glover as Charlie Pratt
 Sam Jones III as Chaz Pratt
 Hassan Johnson as Darnell Thibeaux

Guest stars
 Sharif Atkins as Dr. Michael Gallant
 Ray Liotta as Charlie Metcalf
 Dan Hedaya as Herb Spivak
 Chad Lowe as Dr. George Henry
 Cynthia Nixon as Ellie Shore
 Louise Fletcher as Roberta 'Birdie' Chadwick
 Red Buttons as Jules Rubadoux
 Josh Gad as Sgt. Bruce Larabee

Production
Former executive producer Lydia Woodward returns as a consultant producer and writer.

Episodes

References

External links 
 

Iraq War in television
2004 American television seasons
2005 American television seasons
ER (TV series) seasons